Persicaria odorata, with common names Vietnamese coriander, rau răm, laksa leaf, Vietnamese cilantro, phak phai, praew leaf, hot mint, Cambodian mint and Vietnamese mint, is a herb whose leaves are used in Southeast Asian and Northeast Indian cooking.

Vietnamese coriander is not related to the mints, nor is it in the mint family Lamiaceae, but its general appearance and fragrance are reminiscent of them. Persicaria is in the family Polygonaceae, collectively known as "smartweeds" or "pinkweeds".

Food uses

Primarily the leaf is identified with Vietnamese cuisine, where it is commonly eaten fresh in salads (including chicken salad) and in raw gỏi cuốn, as well as in some soups such as canh chua and bún thang, and stews, such as fish kho tộ. It is also popularly eaten with trứng vịt lộn (fertilized duck egg).

However, in Malaysia, Singapore and Indonesia, the shredded leaf is an essential ingredient of the popular laksa dish, a spicy noodle soup, so much so that the leaf is commonly referred to as "laksa leaf" (daun laksa). The Malays called the leaves 'daun kesum' and is used in Malaysia for the dishes nasi kerabu and asam pedas.

In the cuisine of Cambodia, the leaf is known as ( chi krasang tomhom) and is used in soups, stews, salads, and the Cambodian summer rolls, naem (ណែម).

In Laos and certain parts of Thailand, the leaf is eaten with raw beef larb.

The leaves are locally known as phak phai in Manipur, India. The Khoibu community grind the leaves with ghost pepper and a nut locally known as "bonra" to make a spicy side dish.

In Australia, the plant is being investigated as a source of essential oil (kesom oil).

Characteristics
The Vietnamese coriander is a perennial plant that grows best in tropical and subtropical zones in warm and damp conditions.
The top of its leaf is dark green, with chestnut-colored spots, while the leaf's bottom is burgundy red. The stem is jointed at each leaf. In Vietnam, it can be cultivated or found in the wild.
It can grow very well outside in summer in nontropical Europe. It prefers full sun and well-drained soil. For colder climate zones, they should be brought inside for the winter and treated as a house plant. For climate zones that have milder winters, they will survive outside, although their growth may slow down. It rarely flowers outside the tropics.

Components
Its oil contains aldehydes such as decanal (28%), and the alcohols dodecanol (44%) and decanol (11%). Sesquiterpenes such as α-humulene and β-caryophyllene comprise about 15% of its oil.

C-Methylated homoisoflavanones (3-(4'-methoxy-benzyl)-5,7-dihydroxy-6-methyl-8-methoxy-chroman-4-one, 3-(4'-methoxy-benzyl)-5,7-dihydroxy-6,8-dimethyl-chroman-4-one, 3-(4'-hydroxy-benzyl)-5,7-dihydroxy-6,8-dimethyl-chroman-4-one, 3-(4'-hydroxy-benzyl)-5,7-dihydroxy-6-methyl-8-methoxy-chroman-4-one and 3-(4'-hydroxy-benzyl)-5,7-dihydroxy-6-methyl-chroman-4-one) can be found in the rhizomes of P. odoratum.

Traditional uses
No scientific studies have measured P. odorata'''s effects on libido. Traditionally, in Vietnam, the herb is believed to repress sexual urges.  A saying in Vietnamese states, "rau răm, giá sống"'' ("Vietnamese coriander, raw bean sprouts"), which refers to the common belief that Vietnamese coriander reduces sexual desire, while bean sprouts have the opposite effect.  Many Buddhist monks grow coriander in their private gardens and eat it frequently, believing it helps them remain celibate.

Cultivation
North American sources state Persicaria odorata can be grown outside in frost free parts of USDA Zones 9-11 in moderately fertile soil which is poor or well-drained but will remain moist to wet. It can tolerate full sun if there are breezes and boggy moist soil. However, part shade is desirable and it can be used as groundcover under trees.
If winter temperatures drop below 7°C/45°F overwintering indoors is possible if humidity can be maintained. Northern European sources proscribe all but summer under glass as it is hardy to H1C (minimum 5-10°C) with West and South facing aspects preferable.
Persicaria odorata grows up to 6-18 inches tall and wide (15-45 cm) in US and UK sources state 1 metre height by 1.5 m spread are possible in 2 to 5 years.
Pests and diseases are not regarded as being problematic and it is even resistant to deer and rabbit.

Propagation
Propagate by seed in autumn or spring but flowering and seed harvests are rare in non tropical climes. 
In summer, propagation via semi-ripe cuttings should be straightforward. Rooting cuttings in water is so easy that North American sources recommend against overwintering indoors where humidity cannot be maintained. Rather, source fresh bunches of rau răm in early spring cost effectively from Asian supermarkets. Remove the young leaves at the very top of the stems and any large leaves along the stems. Trim the bottom off stems to the first healthy internode and place in water until 1-2 cm roots appear below the lowest node and then plant in soil. Expect to harvest around two months later.

References

External links
 How to grow Persicaria odorata
 Vietnamese instructional video on Persicaria odorata cultivation and propagation
 English language instructional video on Persicaria odorata cultivation and propagation

odorata
Malay cuisine
Flora of China
Flora of Indo-China
Plants described in 1790
Herbs
Medicinal plants